Toluse "Tolu" Olorunnipa (is a Nigerian-American journalist and political commentator. He is the first reporter of native African and Nigerian descent to cover the White House. Of Yoruba heritage, Olorunnipa was recently named the White House Bureau Chief for The Washington Post in July 2022.

Education 
Olorunnipa earned a Bachelor of Arts in Sociology and MSc from Stanford University. In college, Olorunnipa wrote for The Stanford Daily.

Career 
Olorunnipa writes for The Washington Post and is an analyst for CNN. He previously worked for Bloomberg News and The Miami Herald. His columns have been featured in The Wall Street Journal, The Chicago Tribune, Bloomberg Businessweek, The Tampa Bay Times, The Seattle Times, The Nation, and others. He has been featured as a panelist on Washington Week and Face the Nation, and frequently appears on CNN, MSNBC, CBS News, and C-SPAN as a political analyst.

In 2022 he coauthored the biography about George Floyd His Name Is George Floyd: One Man's Life and the Struggle for Racial Justice with journalist Robert Samuels.

References

External links 
 
 Toluse Olorunnipa in the Internet Movie Database
Washington post profile of Toluse Olorunnipa

Living people
1986 births
Nigerian emigrants to the United States
Stanford University alumni
American television reporters and correspondents
Emmy Award winners
CNN people
American people of Yoruba descent
Yoruba journalists
African-American journalists
21st-century African-American people
20th-century African-American people